The Godavari is a river in India.

Godavari may also refer to:

Places
 East Godavari district, in Andhra Pradesh, India
 West Godavari district, in Andhra Pradesh, India
 Godavari District of British India, prior to its bifurcation into East and West districts in 1925

Bridges
 Old Godavari Bridge or Havelock Bridge (1900–1997), a decommissioned bridge on the River Godavari in Rajahmundry, India
 Godavari Arch Bridge (opened 1997), a bowstring-girder bridge on the River Godavari in Rajahmundry, India
 Godavari Bridge (opened 1974), a truss bridge on the River Godavari in Rajahmundry, India

Transportation
 Godavari Express , a train of the South Central Railway that runs between Visakhapatnam and Hyderabad. 
 Godavari-class frigate, a class of guided-missile frigates of the Indian Navy
 INS Godavari, several ships of the Indian Navy
 Godavari railway station, a railway station in Rajahmundry, East Godavari district, India

Other uses
 Godavari (2006 film)
 Godavari (2021 film)

See also
 Godawari (disambiguation)